Lion's Head Provincial Park is a nature reserve in Ontario, Canada, located near the town of Lion's Head on Georgian Bay. The park contains portions of the Niagara Escarpment and is noted for its glacial features, especially potholes. Part of the Bruce Trail runs through the park.

References

External links

Niagara Escarpment
Parks in Bruce County
Provincial parks of Ontario
Nature reserves in Ontario
Year of establishment missing